Kalan (also Romanized as Kalān) is a village in Yeylaq Rural District, in the Central District of Kaleybar County, East Azerbaijan Province, Iran. At the 2006 census, its population was 71, in 17 families.

References 

Populated places in Kaleybar County